This is a list of Muslim scientists who have contributed significantly to science and civilization in the Islamic Golden Age (i.e. from the 8th century to the 14th century).

Astronomers and astrologers 
 Ibrahim al-Fazari (d. 777)
 Muhammad al-Fazari (d. 796 or 806)
 Al-Khwarizmi (d. 850)
Sanad ibn Ali (d. 864)
Al-Marwazi (d. 869)
 Al-Farghani (d. 870)
Al-Mahani (d. 880)
Abu Ma'shar al-Balkhi (d. 886)
Dīnawarī (d. 896)
 Banū Mūsā (d. 9th century)
Abu Sa'id Gorgani (d. 9th century)
Ahmad Nahavandi (d. 9th century)
Al-Nayrizi (d. 922)
Al-Battani (d. 929)
Abū Ja'far al-Khāzin (d. 971)
Abd Al-Rahman Al Sufi (d. 986)
 Al-Saghani (d. 990)
 Abū al-Wafā' al-Būzjānī (d. 998)
Abu Al-Fadl Harawi (d. 10th century)
 Abū Sahl al-Qūhī (d. 1000)
Abu-Mahmud al-Khujandi (d. 1000)
 Al-Majriti (d. 1007)
Ibn Yunus (d. 1009)
 Kushyar ibn Labban (d. 1029)
 Abu Nasr Mansur (d. 1036)
 Abu l-Hasan 'Ali (d. 1037)
 Ibn Sina (d. 1037)
Ibn al-Haytham (d. 1040)
Al-Bīrūnī (d. 1048)
Ali ibn Ridwan (d. 1061)
 Abū Ishāq Ibrāhīm al-Zarqālī (d. 1087)
 Omar Khayyám (d. 1131)
 Ibn Bajjah (d. 1138)
 Ibn Tufail (d. 1185)
 Ibn Rushd (d. 1198)
Al-Khazini (d. 12th century)
 Nur ad-Din al-Bitruji (d. 1204)
 Sharaf al-Dīn al-Tūsī (d. 1213)
Mu'ayyad al-Din al-'Urdi (d. 1266)
 Nasir al-Din Tusi (d. 1274)
Shams al-Dīn al-Samarqandī (d. 1310)
 Qutb al-Din al-Shirazi (d. 1311)
Sadr al-Shari'a al-Asghar (d. 1346)
 Ibn al-Shatir (d. 1375)
 Shams al-Dīn Abū Abd Allāh al-Khalīlī (d. 1380)
 Jamshīd al-Kāshī (d. 1429)
 Ulugh Beg (d. 1449)
 Ali Qushji (d. 1474)

Physiologists 

 Ibn Sirin (654–728), author of work on dreams and dream interpretation
 Al-Kindi (801–873) (Alkindus), pioneer of psychotherapy and music therapy
 Ali ibn Sahl Rabban al-Tabari (9th century), pioneer of psychiatry, clinical psychiatry and clinical psychology
 Ahmed ibn Sahl al-Balkhi (850–934), pioneer of mental health,  medical psychology, cognitive psychology, cognitive therapy, psychophysiology and psychosomatic medicine
 Al-Farabi (872–950) (Alpharabius), pioneer of social psychology and consciousness studies
 Abu al-Qasim al-Zahrawi (936–1013) (Abulcasis), pioneer of neurosurgery
 Ibn al-Haytham (965–1040) (Alhazen), founder of experimental psychology, psychophysics, phenomenology and visual perception
 Al-Biruni (973–1050), pioneer of reaction time
 Avicenna (980–1037) (Ibn Sīnā), pioneer of neuropsychiatry, thought experiment, self-awareness and self-consciousness
 Ibn Zuhr (1094–1162) (Avenzoar), pioneer of neurology and neuropharmacology
 Averroes, pioneer of Parkinson's disease
 Ibn Tufail (1126–1198), pioneer of tabula rasa and nature versus nurture

Chemists and alchemists 

 Khalid ibn Yazid (–85 AH/ 704) (Calid)
 Jafar al-Sadiq (702–765)
 Jābir ibn Hayyān (d. c. 806–816) (Geber, not to be confused with pseudo-Geber)
 Al-Khwārizmī (780–850), algebra, mathematics
 Abbas Ibn Firnas (810–887) (Armen Firman)
 Al-Kindi (801–873) (Alkindus)
 Al-Majriti (fl. 1007–1008) (950–1007) 
 Ibn Miskawayh (932–1030)
 Abū Rayhān al-Bīrūnī (973–1048)
 Avicenna (980–1037)
 Al-Khazini (fl. 1115–1130)
 Nasir al-Din Tusi (1201–1274)
 Ibn Khaldun (1332–1406)

Economists and social scientists 

Abu Hanifa an-Nu‘man (699–767), Islamic jurisprudence scholar
Abu Yusuf (731–798), Islamic jurisprudence scholar
Al-Saghani (–990), one of the earliest historians of science
Abū Rayhān al-Bīrūnī (973–1048), Anthropology", Indology
Ibn Sīnā (Avicenna) (980–1037), economist
Ibn Miskawayh (932–1030), economist
Al-Ghazali (Algazel) (1058–1111), economist
Al-Mawardi (1075–1158), economist
Nasīr al-Dīn al-Tūsī (Tusi) (1201–1274), economist
Ibn al-Nafis (1213–1288), sociologist
Ibn Taymiyyah (1263–1328), economist
Ibn Khaldun (1332–1406), forerunner of social sciences such as demography, cultural history, historiography, philosophy of history, sociology and economics
Al-Maqrizi (1364–1442), economist

Geographers and earth scientists 

 Al-Masudi, the "Herodotus of the Arabs", and pioneer of historical geography
 Al-Kindi, pioneer of environmental science
 al-Hamdani
 Ibn Al-Jazzar
 Al-Tamimi
 Al-Masihi
 Ali ibn Ridwan
 Muhammad al-Idrisi, also a cartographer
 Ahmad ibn Fadlan
 Abū Rayhān al-Bīrūnī, geodesy, geology and Anthropology
 Avicenna
 Abd al-Latif al-Baghdadi
 Averroes
 Ibn al-Nafis
 Ibn Jubayr
 Ibn Battuta
 Ibn Khaldun
 Piri Reis
 Evliya Çelebi

Mathematicians 

 Ali Qushji
 Al-Hajjāj ibn Yūsuf ibn Matar
 Khalid ibn Yazid (Calid)
 Muhammad ibn Mūsā al-Khwārizmī (Algorismi), algebra and algorithms
 'Abd al-Hamīd ibn Turk
 Abū al-Hasan ibn Alī al-Qalasādī (1412–1482), pioneer of symbolic algebra
 Abū Kāmil Shujā ibn Aslam
 Al-Abbās ibn Said al-Jawharī
 Al-Kindi (Alkindus)
 Banū Mūsā (Ben Mousa)
 Ja'far Muhammad ibn Mūsā ibn Shākir
 Al-Hasan ibn Mūsā ibn Shākir
 Al-Mahani
 Ahmed ibn Yusuf
 Al-Majriti
 Al-Battani (Albatenius)
 Al-Farabi (Abunaser)
 Al-Nayrizi
 Abū Ja'far al-Khāzin
 Brethren of Purity
 Abu'l-Hasan al-Uqlidisi
 Al-Saghani
 Abū Sahl al-Qūhī
 Abu-Mahmud al-Khujandi
 Abū al-Wafā' al-Būzjānī
 Ibn Sahl
 Al-Sijzi
 Ibn Yunus
 Abu Nasr Mansur
 Kushyar ibn Labban
 Al-Karaji
 Ibn al-Haytham (Alhacen/Alhazen)
 Abū Rayhān al-Bīrūnī
 Ibn Tahir al-Baghdadi
 Al-Nasawi
 Al-Jayyani
 Abū Ishāq Ibrāhīm al-Zarqālī (Arzachel)
 Al-Mu'taman ibn Hud
 Omar Khayyám
 Al-Khazini
 Ibn Bajjah (Avempace)
 Al-Ghazali (Algazel)
 Al-Marrakushi
 Al-Samawal
 Ibn Rushd (Averroes)
 Ibn Seena (Avicenna)
 Hunayn ibn Ishaq
 Ibn al-Banna'
 Ibn al-Shatir
 Ja'far ibn Muhammad Abu Ma'shar al-Balkhi (Albumasar)
 Jamshīd al-Kāshī
 Kamāl al-Dīn al-Fārisī
 Muḥyi al-Dīn al-Maghribī
 Mo'ayyeduddin Urdi
 Muhammad Baqir Yazdi
 Nasir al-Din al-Tusi, 13th century Persian mathematician and philosopher
 Qāḍī Zāda al-Rūmī
 Qutb al-Din al-Shirazi
 Shams al-Dīn al-Samarqandī
 Sharaf al-Dīn al-Tūsī
 Taqi al-Din Muhammad ibn Ma'ruf
 Ulugh Beg
 Al-Samawal al-Maghribi (1130–1180)

Philosophers

For a detailed list of Muslim philosophers, refer to the List of Muslim philosophers, this list only includes philosophers who were active in the medieval Islamic world.

 Al-Kindi
 Averroes
 Muhammad ibn Zakariya al-Razi
 Al-Farabi
 Avicenna
 Ibn Arabi
 Rumi
 Jami
 Ibn Khaldun
 Nasir al-Din al-Tusi

Physicists and engineers 

 Mimar Sinan (1489–1588), also known as Koca Mi'mâr Sinân Âğâ
 Jafar al-Sadiq, 8th century
 Banū Mūsā (Ben Mousa), 9th century
 Ja'far Muhammad ibn Mūsā ibn Shākir
 Ahmad ibn Mūsā ibn Shākir
 Al-Hasan ibn Mūsā ibn Shākir
 Abbas Ibn Firnas (Armen Firman), 9th century
 Al-Saghani (d. 990)
 Abū Sahl al-Qūhī (Kuhi), 10th century
 Ibn Sahl, 10th century
 Ibn Yunus, 10th century
 Al-Karaji, 10th century
 Ibn al-Haytham (Alhacen), 11th century Iraqi scientist, optics, and experimental physics
 Abū Rayhān al-Bīrūnī, 11th century, pioneer of experimental mechanics
 Ibn Sīnā/Seena (Avicenna), 11th century
 Al-Khazini, 12th century
 Ibn Bajjah (Avempace), 12th century
 Hibat Allah Abu'l-Barakat al-Baghdaadi (Nathanel), 12th century
 Ibn Rushd (Averroes), 12th century Andalusian mathematician, philosopher and medical expert
 Al-Jazari, 13th century civil engineer
 Nasir al-Din Tusi, 13th century
 Qutb al-Din al-Shirazi, 13th century
 Kamāl al-Dīn al-Fārisī, 13th century
 Ibn al-Shatir, 14th century

See also
List of Arab scientists and scholars
List of Christian scientists and scholars of the medieval Islamic world
List of Iranian scientists and scholars

Notes

References

Islam and science
Scientists
 
Medieval Islamic world-related lists